Kavuru is a village in Palnadu district of the Indian state of Andhra Pradesh. It is the headquarters of Chilakaluripet mandal in Narasaraopet revenue division.

Geography 
Kavuru is situated to the northwest of the mandal headquarters, Purushothapatnam,

Governance 

Kavuru gram panchayat is the local self-government of the village. It is divided into wards and each ward is represented by a ward member.

Education 

As per the school information report for the academic year 2018–19, the village has a total of 5 schools. These schools include 1 private and 4 Zilla/Mandal Parishad schools.

Hospitals

References 

Villages in Palnadu district